Ron Brown (18 April 1924 – 23 March 2008) was a New Zealand cricketer. He played in fourteen first-class matches for Central Districts from 1952 to 1958.

See also
 List of Central Districts representative cricketers

References

External links
 

1924 births
2008 deaths
New Zealand cricketers
Central Districts cricketers
Cricketers from Auckland